Joshua Mees (born 15 April 1996) is a German professional footballer who plays as a forward for Jahn Regensburg, on loan from Holstein Kiel.

Career
Mees made his professional debut with SSV Jahn Regensburg on 29 July 2017 in a 2–1 loss against Arminia Bielefeld.

Mees moved to 2. Bundesliga club Holstein Kiel from Union Berlin. He signed a four-year contract.

References

External links
 
 
 

1996 births
Living people
People from Lebach
German footballers
Footballers from Saarland
Association football forwards
Germany youth international footballers
Bundesliga players
2. Bundesliga players
TSG 1899 Hoffenheim players
SC Freiburg players
SSV Jahn Regensburg players
1. FC Union Berlin players
Holstein Kiel players